The following is a list of Grammy Awards winners and nominees from India.

List

See also
List of Indian winners and nominees of the Academy Awards
 List of Indian winners and nominees of the Golden Globe Awards
 List of Indian winners and nominees at the Cannes Film Festival

References

Indian
Grammy
 Grammy
Grammy
Grammy